Erythrolamprus albertguentheri, also known commonly as   Günther's green liophis, is a species of snake in the family Colubridae. The species is found in  Bolivia, Paraguay, and Argentina.

References

Erythrolamprus
Reptiles of Bolivia
Reptiles of Paraguay
Reptiles of Argentina
Reptiles described in 2012